The Fat Cat Brewery is a brewery located at the Fat Cat Brewery Tap, Lawson Road, Norwich in the English county of Norfolk. The brewery is owned by Colin Keatley landlord of the Fat Cat public house twice winner of the CAMRA National Pub of the Year.

History

In 2004, Keatley acquired the 1970s built Wherry public house  with the ultimate aim of creating a brewery on the premises. After renaming the pub The Shed  and later the Cider Shed  following a legal dispute. The brewery was opened in September 2005 by Roger Protz editor of the Good Beer Guide. Today 2011, the brewery supplies beer under the guidance of former Woodforde's brewer Ray Ashworth to its sister-pubs the Fat Cat and the Fat Cat and Canary, and also to other wholesale and retail outlets.

References

Breweries in England
Companies based in Norwich
British companies established in 2005
Food and drink companies established in 2005
2005 establishments in England